CYP26C1   (cytochrome P450, family 26, subfamily c, polypeptide 1) is a protein which in humans is encoded by the CYP26C1 gene.

This gene encodes a member of the cytochrome P450 superfamily of enzymes. The cytochrome P450 proteins are monooxygenases which catalyze many reactions involved in drug metabolism and synthesis of cholesterol, steroids and other lipids. This enzyme is involved in the catabolism of all-trans- and 9-cis-retinoic acid, and thus contributes to the regulation of retinoic acid levels in cells and tissues.

CYP26C1 was found to show no expression in colorectal cancer cells or normal colonic epithelium.

References

External links

Further reading